Chris Roosevelt Jones (born 23 October 1991) is Liberian footballer who plays for German club FC Germania Friedrichstal as a midfielder.

Career 
Jones has played club football in Germany for ASV Durlach, Karlsruher SC II, and SVN Zweibrücken.

He made his international debut for Liberia in 2014.

References

1991 births
Living people
Liberian footballers
Liberia international footballers
ASV Durlach players
Karlsruher SC II players
FC Nöttingen players
SVN Zweibrücken players
Association football midfielders
Liberian expatriate footballers
Liberian expatriate sportspeople in Germany
Expatriate footballers in Germany